Ghotki District is a district of the province of Sindh, Pakistan, with headquarter the city of Mirpur Mathelo. Prior to its establishment as a district in 1993, it formed part of Sukkur District.

Geography 
Ghotki District is stretched in  6975 km2 (1,555,528 acres).  25,000 acres area of the district consisting of desert land, 402,578 acres (25.88%) is flooded (Katcha) area and remaining area lying between desert and flooded areas of district is cultivated. Desert area having wind-blown hills as Achro Thar (White Desert). Flooded area (Kacha) is stretched on 87 km along Indus River from north - east to south - west of the district where forests exist in this area.

Administration
The Ghotki district is administratively subdivided into the following Tehsils:
 Mirpur Mathelo Tehsil
 Daharki Tehsil
 Ghotki Tehsil
 Ubauro Tehsil
 Khangarh Tehsil

Demographics

At the time of the 2017 census, Ghotki district had a population of 1,648,708, of which 360,821 (21.89%) lived in urban areas. Ghotki had a sex ratio of 939 females per 1000 males and a literacy rate of 40.88%: 57.46% for males and 23.35% for females.

The majority religion is Islam, with 93.67% of the population. Hinduism (including those from Scheduled Castes) is practiced by 6.19% of the population.

At the time of the 2017 census, 93.37% of the population spoke Sindhi, 2.49% Urdu, 1.64% Punjabi and 1.05% Saraiki as their first language.

The historic Hindu temple Shadani Darbar is located in this district.

List of Dehs
The following is a list of Dadu District's 351 dehs, organised by taluka:

 Ghotki Taluka (77 dehs)
 Adilpur
 Amirabad
 Attal Muradani
 Bago Daho
 Bandh
 Baqro
 Behishti
 Belo Gublo
 Belo Jamshero
 Belo Sangri
 Beriri
 Bhanjro
 Bhiryalo
 Bhityoon
 Changlani
 Dari
 Dhamaji
 Doomano
 Drago
 Dring Chachhar
 Erazi
 Esa Wali
 Fazal Bhayo
 Hakra
 Hamro
 Hussain Beli
 Jahanpur
 Jamal
 Janghiari
 Katcho Bahab
 Katcho Bindi
 Katcho Miranpur
 Katcho Tibi
 Katco Buxo Ghoto
 Khadwari
 Khahi Daro
 Kham
 Khuhara
 Azmat Khan Bharo
 Kotlo Bullo
 Labana
 Lakhan
 Laloowali
 Maka
 Malhir
 Malook Wali
 Mathelo
 Miyani
 Moto Mahar
 Muhammad Pur
 Odharwali
 Pacco Bahab
 Pacco Bindi
 Pacco Buxo Ghoto
 Pacco Miranpur
 Pacco Tibi
 Pano Khalso
 Phekrato
 Qadirpur
 Qaloo Malhan
 Qazi Wahan
 Ruk
 Salehn Malhar
 Sangi Ghotki
 Sangri
 Sarhad
 Satabo Bhayo
 Shafiabad
 Shaikhani
 Suhriani
 Sundrani
 Thatho Malhan
 Vidhur
 Wad Pagiya
 Wagni
 Wasayo Chachar
 Wasti Inayat Shah
 Wasti Q. Din Shah
 Daharki Taluka (48 dehs)
 Alamarain
 Bago Daro
 Belo Berutta
 Berutta
 Chacharki
 Chanad
 Chhoranwalo
 Daharki
 Derawaro
 Dhandh Raharki
 Goi
 Gorhelo
 Gulo Pitafi
 Hamidpur
 Hiko
 Ibrahim Pitafi
 Jado Pitafi
 Jampur
 Jhanwar
 Jhum
 Jung
 Bharo
 Kalwar
 Katta
 Khenjho
 Kherohi
 Khushkh
 Kotlo
 Lal Pitafi
 Looni
 Maringaro
 Mirzapur
 Poh No1
 Poh No2
 Raharki
 Rail
 Raini
 Sain Dino Malik
 Sanilo
 Sanko
 Sejan
 Shahbazpur
 Simno
 Sutiayaro No5
 Sutiyaro Chak No1
 Sutiyaro Chak No2
 Takio M. Pannah
 Vijnoth
 Wahi Gul Khan
 Khan Garh Taluka (37 dehs)
 Aithi
 Ali Mahar
 Ari Mahar
 Bambli
 Bandwari
 Bari
 Bhetoor
 Bhitoin
 Chak Qazi Badal
 Chhanwani
 Dakhano
 Ibrahim Mahar
 Izat Wari
 Kandlo
 Khabar Chachar
 Khangarh
 Khanpur
 Lakho Mahar
 Lohi
 Makahi
 Mithri
 Naro
 Pathan Mahar
 Phul Daho
 Qazi Badal
 Raanyar
 Sahta
 Samo Wah
 Sanharo
 Shahpur
 Sutiaro No. 1
 Sutiaro No. 3
 Tarai
 Wahi Dhano
 Waloo Mahar
 Walrah
 Warwaro
 Mirpur Matelo Taluka (60 dehs)
 Akhtiar Waseer
 Alim Khan Gadani
 Baloch Khan
 Barar
 Bel Mirpur
 Belo Waseer
 Belo Bozdar
 Bhiri Laghari
 Chijjan
 Damanon
 Darwesh Naich
 Dhangro
 Dil Muard Gabole
 Dino Mako
 Drib Dethri
 Fatehpur
 Gahno lund
 Gaji Gadani
 Garhi Chakar
 Gendarko
 Gurkan
 Haj Korai
 Hamind Korai
 Hayat Pitafi
 Ismail Bozdar
 Jahan Khan Unar
 Jarwar
 Jhangan
 Jindo Pitafi
 Kander
 Karampur
 Khansar
 Khu Meenhon
 Khui Khengi
 Lashkri Lund
 Latif Shah
 Machalo
 Malnas
 Meroja
 Mirpur
 Mitho Lund
 Nhundri
 Pipri
 Sabar Bozdar
 Saeed Khan Chandio
 Sahib Khan Lund
 Shekhan Wari
 Sher Ali Gabole
 Sher Khan Bozdar
 Sher Khan Kolachi
 Sobho Lund
 Sono Pitafi
 Suhanjro
 Sutyaro 1
 Sutyaro 4
 Tahir Gadani
 Wah Bakro
 Wadhi Ghoto
 Wahi Mubarak
 Yaro Lund
 Ubauro Taluka
 B. Rano Rahar
 Band
 Bapar
 Belo Rawanti
 Bindi adam
 Bindo A. Sattar
 Bori
 Chanali
 Chandia
 Chatu Daho
 Dabli
 Daulatpur
 Daveri
 Detha Bhaya
 Dilwaro
 Dub
 Garang
 Ghundi
 Girkno
 Gohram chachar
 Goongo daho
 Islam Lashari
 Jhangal Dawo
 Jhangal malik
 Kalwli
 Kamo Shaheed
 Katcho miani malook
 Keenjhar
 Khambhra
 Khamiso Chachar
 Koraiki
 Kotlo kamil
 Kotlo Yousuf
 Kubhur
 Kundri Walo
 Mari
 Maroowalo
 Matar Kot
 Muhammad Pur
 Muradpur
 Naseer dhandu
 Nurley
 Pako miani malook
 Pir Bux
 Rajanpur
 Rano Rahar
 Rawanti
 Reti
 Rind
 Sayed Pur
 Shadi walo
 Shahwali
 Shams chapri
 Shewani
 Soi Sharef
 Sonan
 Tig
 Ubauro
 W. J. Shah
 Warwalo

Economy 
Ghotki District has recently embraced sugar cane. The total acreage of cultivable land is 286,090 ha in 2019–20. The area under cultivation of sugar cane increased to 58,774 ha in 2019-20 from 6,511 ha in 2011–12. Five functional sugar mills are located in the district.

Culture 
Ghotki District is the land of Saint where is many Saint's Tomb. 1- Syed Anwar shah at Jahnpur 2- Syed Jaleel Shah Mast 5 killo meters away from Mipur Mathelo town 3- Nare shah Jelani In Ghotki Town. Ghotki Disrict is many historical places one of them is Mathelo Moomal Ji Mari, there is a museum and at the same place Very popular saint Syed Nathan shah's (Naharo)  Tomb.

See also
2019 Ghotki riots

Notes

References

Bibliography

 
Districts of Sindh